Mikayla Pirini (born 29 June 1996) is a New Zealand-born Australian professional basketball player.

Career

WNBL
Born in New Zealand, Pirini grew up in Perth, Western Australia. She began her WNBL career in her home town, as a development player, with the West Coast Waves for the 2013–14 WNBL season. Pirini remained a team member for the following season. She was then signed by the Adelaide Lightning for 2015–16, as opposed to remaining with the rebranded Perth Lynx.

After two seasons interstate playing with the Diamond Valley Eagles in the Big V, Pirini returned home joining the Perth Lynx as a development player for the 2017–18 WNBL season.

National team
Pirini first played for Australia at the 2013 Australian Youth Olympic Festival, where she took home a silver medal, in the women's 3X3 competition. She then went on to represent Australia at the 2015 FIBA Under-19 World Championship in Russia, where she helped the team take home the bronze medal.

References

1996 births
Living people
Adelaide Lightning players
Australian women's basketball players
Guards (basketball)
People from Queenstown, New Zealand
Basketball players from Perth, Western Australia
Perth Lynx players